Steven Alexander James, FRSA (born 21 November 1968) is an English musician, best known as the bassist of the rock band Blur, he has also played with temporary bands Fat Les, Me Me Me, WigWam and Bad Lieutenant.

Music career

James was born in Boscombe, Bournemouth, and attended the state grammar school Bournemouth School, where he started playing in bands. He credits the Beatles with inspiring him to pursue music: "I was off school with chickenpox when John Lennon was shot in 1980. I spent the week watching a VHS recording of the Beatles film Help!, which was broadcast on TV the day he died. I still watch it once a year. Then I bought a Beatles songbook and a guitar, figured out the chord shapes and started strumming and singing along. I never looked back."

In 1988, James met future bandmate Graham Coxon at Goldsmiths College, where James studied French. Introductions with Coxon's old school friend Damon Albarn and Dave Rowntree soon took place; at the time Albarn and Rowntree were part of a band called Circus.

In 1989, James joined Coxon, Albarn and Rowntree's new band, Seymour, which would later be renamed Blur. While he has been in the band ever since, he now describes the experience as "a past-life".

Despite this, Blur got together with returning bandmate Graham Coxon to perform at Glastonbury Festival, Hyde Park, Oxegen and T in the Park during the summer of 2009. They also played shows at Goldsmiths College, Essex Museum and other venues around the UK and mainland Europe. Blur headlined a show at Hyde Park for the 2012 Summer Olympics closing ceremony. In 2013, the band performed at the Rock Werchter in Belgium, the Spanish and Portuguese dates of the Primavera Sound festival, and the Coachella Valley Music and Arts Festival in the United States.

Collaborations 

Unlike Albarn, Coxon and Rowntree, James has not released any solo material, although he has been involved in other collaborative side projects. In 1998, James formed Fat Les with actor Keith Allen and artist Damien Hirst, releasing the unofficial theme song (excluding three others) "Vindaloo" for the 1998 FIFA World Cup, which reached number 2 in the UK Singles Chart. He also worked on side project Me Me Me with Stephen Duffy, co-wrote songs for Marianne Faithfull (appearing in drag playing a double bass in the music video for her single "Sex With Strangers") and Jane McDonald, and worked with Florence and the Machine and Gene Loves Jezebel.

James worked with Sophie Ellis-Bextor on her solo debut Read My Lips, co-writing and co-producing "Move This Mountain", and co-producing "I Believe" with Ellis-Bextor and producer Ben Hillier. He also played bass on both tracks. Ellis-Bextor's 2003 album, Shoot from the Hip also featured James as bass player and co-writer on the track "Love Is It Love". He also joined his friend and singer-songwriter Betty Boo in a band called WigWam in 2005. In 2009, James appeared as bass player on debut Bad Lieutenant record Never Cry Another Tear. The band consists of New Order lead singer Bernard Sumner and guitarist Phil Cunningham, along with Jake Evans of Rambo And Leroy. In 2013, James co-wrote the song "Did I Lose You?", performed by Giorgia and Olly Murs.

Other ventures

Writing 
Alex James is a food writer for The Sun and has a weekly column, 'Alex James on All Things Food'; as well as a regular column on farm and family life in The Sunday Telegraph titled 'Mucking In'. He also writes a monthly column on cheese for Esquire Magazine.
Alex contributes to a number of other British newspapers including  The Independent, The Observer, The Times, and The Sunday Times, as well as Q magazine, The Spectator and The Idler. An autobiography of James's experience with Blur, Bit of a Blur, was published in June 2007 by Little, Brown & Company. It has since been described as "the definitive guide to Britpop". James published a follow-up entitled All Cheeses Great and Small: A Life Less Blurry in September 2011, charting his transformation from rock star to cheesemaker as he moves to a farm in Oxfordshire.

Television appearances 
In 2001, James and Graham Coxon appeared in the Channel 4 Pixies documentary "Gouge". James represented The Idler on BBC Two's University Challenge: The Professionals in 2005 with John Moore of Black Box Recorder. They secured a heavy win over the Financial Times in their heat, but did not score highly enough to return for the tournament's later stages. In 2007, James was a judge on the Channel 4 show Orange unsignedAct and, in November 2007, appeared as a panellist on the BBC One satirical news quiz, Have I Got News for You. He also appeared in episode #3.4 of Gordon Ramsay's The F Word TV series as a participant in the Recipe Challenge which occurs in each episode. In August 2008, James appeared in reality TV series, Maestro on BBC Two. He was voted out in the fourth episode of the series.

In September 2008, a documentary television series, Cocaine Diaries: Alex James in Colombia, premiered on BBC America, in conjunction with the BBC America Reveals program. As the documentary progresses, James – who admits to having used cocaine extensively during Blur's Britpop heyday – learns about Colombia's violent drug export trade. In October 2009, James presented an episode of Never Mind the Buzzcocks and, in January 2010, he participated in the ITV1 reality television programme Popstar to Operastar. On 4 March 2012, James appeared on Top Gear as a guest for their 'star in a reasonably priced car' segment, clocking in at 1:45.2.

On 3 December 2011, he appeared on The Chase with Sara Cox, Ann Widdecombe and Eamonn Holmes against chaser Anne Hegerty, but he was caught by the chaser. On 16 March 2012, James appeared on The Bank Job and made the final, where he was beaten by Rachel Riley. He is also the first Bank Job contestant to find two "bankrupts" in a single game. James has been a participant in BBC One programme 10 Things You Need to Know About Losing Weight. On 26 December 2014, he appeared as one of the celebrity homeowners on Through the Keyhole with Keith Lemon. In August 2015, he won the Channel 4 programme [Celebrity Fifteen to One].

A 2016 documentary titled Alex James: Slowing Down Fast Fashion examined the fashion industry and how "consumers' seemingly unquenchable thirst for cheap clothing is having a huge effect on the environment and workers, both at home here in the UK and abroad".

Radio 
In 2007, James presented the BBC Radio 4 programme On Your Farm. He presents Alex James's Date Night on Classic FM every Saturday at 7-10pm.

James presented The A-Z of Classic FM Music. The show was named Commercial Radio Programme of the Year at the Arqiva Commercial Radio Awards on 5 June 2009. He has also contributed to the show's accompanying memorabilia, writing the foreword to both the book and CD box set, published by Reader's Digest in 2010.

Cheesemaking 
Artisan cheeses
James has become notable for his production of cheese. After his success with Blur, he moved to the Cotswolds, purchasing a farmhouse and renovating it into a burgeoning cheese farm. The 200-acre cheese farm in Kingham, Oxfordshire, now produces award-winning cheeses including 'Alex James Presents' – a range of British artisan cheeses – 'Good Queen Maude', 'Blue Monday', 'Little Wallop', 'Farleigh Wallop', and most recently 'Goddess'.

All are distinct in their flavour: "Blue Monday" (named after his favourite New Order song) is a creamy Shropshire Blue, sharp with a very faint sourness; "Little Wallop" is a soft goats' milk cheese, washed in Somerset cider brandy and wrapped in vine leaves; and "Farleigh Wallop" is a goat's cheese made with sprigs of thyme. The latter was voted Best Goats' Cheese at the 2008 British Cheese Awards, where James himself was a judge in 2010.

Everyday cheeses
James's range of everyday cheeses hit the shelves of Asda in 2011. The flavour combinations include 'cheddar and tomato ketchup', 'cheddar and salad cream', and 'cheddar and tikka masala'.

Tim Chester, writing in The Guardian, described James's cheese as "bizarre flavour mash-ups in sliced, processed, plasticky form".

Jeremy Bowen of cheese sellers Paxton and Whitfield said "They are cheeky price points, they are yummy, they are not difficult to understand. He wants to introduce the great and the good".

Music & food festivals 
James announced he would open his Oxfordshire farm to host an annual food and music festival. The event, titled Alex James Presents Harvest, took place from 9 to 12 September 2011, in conjunction with promoter Big Wheel Promotions.

However, the event had a shaky start when Big Wheel Promotions went bankrupt leaving the ticketing company out of pocket and stallholders and performers unpaid.

The local primary school, Kingham Primary, were also owed £7000 for the entertainment they organised, with the headteacher telling the Guardian that "We are either going to have to lose the music teacher or take it from other budgets which will reduce other parts of the curriculum".

Then, in December 2011, a concert was staged locally to settle the debt. "I pledged to match the funds raised from my own pocket ... I was very happy to do that" said James. Big Wheel Promotions, the company behind 'Harvest', then abruptly ceased trading even though it had already taken ticket fees for 2012. 'Alex James Presents Harvest' will also be remembered for a photograph of Alex James with David Cameron and Jeremy Clarkson.

Since 2012, James, along with Jamie Oliver, has hosted The Big Feastival, an annual food and music festival, on his Oxfordshire farm. On joining forces with James, Oliver said "The Big Feastival was a great success in South London last year and I cannot wait to take this celebration of the greatest chefs, the best local produce and suppliers and some fantastic entertainment to a more rural location at Alex's." Along with live musical performances from Paloma Faith, Gaz Coombes, The Cuban Brothers, Noisettes, Razorlight, Texas, and Sahand, there has been cooking demonstrations and masterclasses, Q&As and book signings with well-known chefs, as well as family entertainment from Peppa Pig, Slow Food Kids' Taste Adventure and Chipping Norton Theatre. 'The Big Feastival' returned to James's farm on 31 August and 1 September 2013 with a line-up including KT Tunstall, The Feeling, Rizzle Kicks and Basement Jaxx. The festival attracted over 30,000 attendees in 2014 and has continued to be held annually on August Bank Holiday weekend.

On 19 June 2019, James visited Bledington Primary School and invited the children to submit a fun, colourful, festival-inspired design. The winning entry was displayed as a stage backdrop at The Big Feastival.
The 2019 festival took place on 23–25 August. The music line-up included Elbow, Lewis Capaldi, Jess Glyne, Rudimental and Jonas Blue, with chefs including Prue Leith, Mark Hix and Candice Brown.

Personal life
James's father, Jason, was sales director of a company selling waste compactors and baling machines. James married Claire Neate, a music video producer, in April 2003 in Cheltenham. They have five children: three boys, Geronimo and twins Artemis and Galileo, and two daughters, Sable and Beatrix. The family live near Kingham in Oxfordshire on a 200-acre (0.81 km2) cheese farm; James is considered by the press to be a member of the Chipping Norton set.

In his book, James describes a long period of decadent lifestyle. To celebrate his birthday in São Paulo one year, he got the tour manager to find him a balthazar of champagne, which he shared with the five prettiest groupies who were at the hotel door. James estimated that he spent about 1 million pounds on champagne and cocaine; in 2015, however, he said that this story was not true. He mentions a long list of favourite bars, including the Groucho Club and The Colony Room.

Bournemouth University presented James with an honorary doctorate in November 2010. He also received an Honorary Doctorate of Arts from the University of Gloucestershire in November 2013.

Bibliography

See also

 List of cheesemakers

References

External links

Alex James regularly contributes to The Spectator magazine
Alex James is one of the regular presenters of BBC Radio 4's On Your Farm
Evenlode Partnership – Alex James and Julie Harbutt's cheese company
Alex James: the cheese diaries, episode 2
Alex James: the cheese diaries, episode 1
Alex James gives up vegetarianism after 17 years
Article on Alex James and cheese manufacture
Alex James presents Never Mind the Buzzcocks (YouTube)
Alex James's top 10 reads, The Guardian, 10 December 1999
Alex James presents on ClassicFM

1968 births
Living people
Alumni of Goldsmiths, University of London
Blur (band) members
Cheesemakers
21st-century English farmers
English male journalists
English male singers
English rock bass guitarists
Male bass guitarists
English songwriters
21st-century English writers
Ivor Novello Award winners
People educated at Bournemouth School
People from Boscombe
Popstar to Operastar contestants
Britpop musicians
Dairy products companies of the United Kingdom
Me Me Me (band) members
People associated with the University of Gloucestershire